The Moluccan monarch (Symposiachrus bimaculatus) is a species of bird in the family Monarchidae.
It is found in Indonesia. Its natural habitats are subtropical or tropical moist lowland forests and subtropical or tropical moist montane forests.

Taxonomy and systematics
This species was formerly placed in the genus Monarcha until moved to Symposiachrus in 2009. Some authorities consider the Moluccan monarch as a subspecies (S. trivirgatus bimaculatus) of the spectacled monarch. The subspecies nigrimentum was formerly considered a subspecies of the spectacled monarch.

Subspecies
There are three subspecies recognized:
 S. b. bimaculatus - (Gray, GR, 1861): found on Morotai, Halmahera and the Bacan Islands (northern Moluccas)
 S. b. diadematus - (Salvadori, 1878): found on Bisa and Obi Island (northern Moluccas)
 S. t. nigrimentum - (Gray, GR, 1861): Seram & Ambon (east-central Moluccas), Gorong & Watubela (southeastern Moluccas)

References

Symposiachrus
Birds described in 1861
Taxa named by George Robert Gray